Manafaru is one of only two resort islands within Haa Alifu Atoll, Republic of Maldives. It is the northernmost resort island in the Maldives, found in the most northerly atoll in the archipelago. It has been the 5-star luxury resort "JA Manafaru", since 2014 a picturesque resort with 84 villas, including three private residences and seven inspired food and beverage outlets, plus Destination Dining and In Villa Dining. Every villa has a pool (some with two) and there is a vast amount of watersports, scuba diving and recreational activities as well as Ayurvedic inspired Spa and Wellness facilities. The resort concentrates on the natural aspects of the island as well as celebrating the cultural and historical importance of the area. The owning family opened the property in 2014 under the JA brand and JA Manafaru continues to garner multiple international awards for service, facilities and location and employs predominantly from the local community. It also boasts the very first wine cave in Maldives called 'The Cellar'. This cave is 2.5meters underground, boasting three rooms and to date is still the largest and deepest in Maldives. Several luxury brands have run the island previously, including the Beach House (a Waldorf Astoria hotel). The island is now owned and operated by the Emirates based Hospitality Group JA Resorts and Hotels LLC.

References

Resorts in the Maldives
Islands of the Maldives